Minister of Foreign Affairs of the Republic of Guinea is a government minister in charge of the Ministry of Foreign Affairs of Guinea, responsible for conducting foreign relations of the country.

The following is a list of foreign ministers of Guinea since its founding in 1958:

References

Foreign
Foreign Ministers
Politicians
Foreign Ministers of Guinea